Sarah Miller, known professionally as Sarah Rivka, is an American writer, musician, and filmmaker. She is best known for producing Hi, How Are You Daniel Johnston, My Suicide, and her work in the experimental music duo Sneer.

Awards

Prize for Excellence in International Education — The Asia Society 2008 
Camério Irvin Pelletier Humanitas — Carrousel international du film de Rimouski 2009
Silver Lei — Honolulu Film Awards 2010
Best Student Film — Peace on Earth Film Festival 2010 
Jury Award Best Experimental Film — NFFTY 2013
First Place Experimental — Josiah Media Festival 2013

References

Year of birth missing (living people)
Living people
American film producers
American experimental musicians